Maria Elisabetta Casellati (born 12 August 1946) is an Italian lawyer and politician. She was President of the Italian Senate from 2018 to 2022. She was the first woman ever to have held this position. Casellati is a long-time member of the liberal-conservative party Forza Italia and served as Undersecretary of Health and Justice in previous governments. In 2022, she was nominated as candidate for President of Italy by the centre-right coalition.

Early life
Born in Rovigo in the year 1946, to noble parents of Calabrian origins. Her father was a partisan during the Second World War. She graduated with a degree in law at the University of Ferrara. She was subsequently a university researcher at the University of Padua. She also practiced the profession of matrimonial lawyer in Padua. For many years, she also worked as a professional lawyer along with her husband, Gianbattista Casellati. She is mother of two children, writer and bicycle advocate Ludovica Casellati and conductor Alvise Casellati.

Political career

Previously a member of the Italian Liberal Party, she joined Forza Italia (FI), the liberal-conservative party founded by Silvio Berlusconi. She held key posts within the party. In March 1994, she was elected to the Italian Senate in the general election, for the single-member constituency of Cittadella, near Padua. During the 12th Legislature, Casellati served as a secretary of Forza Italia's parliamentary group in the Senate and also as a president of the Health Commission.

Casellati was not re-elected in 1996 snap election and was defeated by the Lega Nord candidate by just a few votes. From 1999 to 2000, she served as provincial commissioner of Forza Italia for Rovigo. Following the 2001 general election, Casellati returned to the Senate for the constituency of Padua. During the 14th Legislature, she served as vice-leader of Forza Italia in the Senate. On 30 December 2004, Casellati was appointed undersecretary to Health in Berlusconi's second cabinet. She also held this office in Berlusconi's third cabinet, until 16 May 2006.

She was re-elected again in the 2006 general election, which saw a narrow victory for the centre-left party of Romano Prodi; Casellati was confirmed vice-leader of her party in the Senate. The 2008 election featured a strong showing by Berlusconi's new party The People of Freedom and his centre-right coalition; Casellati was re-elected in the Senate and served as undersecretary for Justice from 12 May 2008 to 16 November 2011, when the conservative Prime Minister was forced to resign amid financial crisis and public protests.

In the 2013 general election, Casellati was elected to the multi-member constituency of Veneto. However, on 15 September 2014 she was elected by the Parliament in joint session to the High Council of the Judiciary (CSM), where she remained as a member until returning to the Senate in 2018 with the revived Forza Italia. At the CSM she served as president of the Third Commission for access to the judiciary and for mobility from October 2016 until her resignation.

President of the Senate
On 24 March 2018 she was elected President of the Senate, becoming the first woman to hold this position. She was supported by her own party, the League, Brothers of Italy and the Five Star Movement.

On 18 April 2018 she was given an exploratory mandate by President Sergio Mattarella to try and reconcile the issues between the centre-right coalition and the Five Star Movement (M5S), in order to break the post-election political deadlock and form a fully functional new government. However, she failed in finding a solution to the disputes between the parties, especially between the M5S and Forza Italia.

On 27 October 2021 she agreed on allowing a secret vote on a law that would have extended Italy's already existing hate speech and hate crime statutes to cover hate based on ability, sex, sexual orientation and gender identity (Italian law currently covers racial-based and religion-based hatred only), by using a provision in the Italian Senate rule of procedures code that is meant to be enacted only when voting on named individuals. This resulted in having the law proposal being voted down, and barred similar provisions from being proposed again in the six months following the vote.

Political views
Casellati has described herself as a conservative and a Catholic; she has often stressed her strong opposition to artificial insemination and has signed a bill to abolish law 194 on the voluntary interruption of pregnancy, describing abortion as "a very serious mistake, which flirts with the culture of death." She is also in favour of the reopening of brothels and the subsequent abolition of the Merlin law.

Casellati strongly opposed the Cirinnà law, promoted by the centre-left government of Matteo Renzi, which recognized same-sex unions in Italy, stating that "family is not an extensible concept and the state cannot equate marriage and civil unions." She also added "any parity between marriages and civil unions would be a blurring of non-overlapping models." Following the approval of the law on 13 May 2016, she gave an interview stating that she believed that the Cirinnà law discriminated against heterosexual couples. During the 2020 International Day Against Homophobia, she stated that "any type of sexual discrimination is something to be considered intolerable and shameful in a modern society. Fighting homophobia and promoting respect is something no one—families, society, working places, politics and institutions—can shy away from".

She supports the chemical castration for those guilty of sexual violence or pedophilia, saying in 2008 that "chemical castration is a path to follow as it is not a violent imposition on those who have committed aberrant offenses, but the administration of a drug that lowers sexual impulses." She supported the Bossi–Fini law, which introduced criminal sentences for those illegally entering Italy; she declared that "only those who have the opportunity to live and keep themselves in dignity should be able to come to Italy."

On 15 March 2013, she presented a law for the abolition of the IMU, the real estate tax promoted by Mario Monti's technocratic government in 2011. She is a strong supporter of the flat tax and when she became president of the Senate, she stated that the priority for Italy was a tax reform to support families and businesses.

Electoral history

First-past-the-post elections

Notes

References

External links

Politicians of Veneto
Living people
1946 births
People from Rovigo
People of Calabrian descent
University of Ferrara alumni
Pontifical Lateran University alumni
20th-century Italian lawyers
21st-century Italian lawyers
Italian women lawyers
Italian Liberal Party politicians
20th-century Italian politicians
Forza Italia politicians
Forza Italia (2013) politicians
The People of Freedom politicians
Women government ministers of Italy
21st-century Italian women politicians
20th-century Italian women politicians
Candidates for President of Italy
Presidents of the Italian Senate
Senators of Legislature XII of Italy
Senators of Legislature XIV of Italy
Senators of Legislature XV of Italy
Senators of Legislature XVI of Italy
Senators of Legislature XVII of Italy
Senators of Legislature XVIII of Italy
20th-century women lawyers
21st-century women lawyers
Academic staff of the University of Padua
Women legislative speakers
Forza Italia (2013) senators
Meloni Cabinet
Government ministers of Italy
Women members of the Senate of the Republic (Italy)